Remember the Day is the first full-length album by the British Progressive metal band Exit Ten.

Track listing

  "Technically Alive"   – 3:51
  "Godspeed"  – 3:37
  "Resume Ignore"  – 3:40
  "Warriors"  – 3:42
  "Remember the Day"  – 3:59
  "Perish in the Flames"  – 3:48
  "Reveal Yourself"  – 3:23
  "Out of Sight"  – 4:42
  "Fine Night"  – 4:25
  "Something to Say"  – 6:30

Credits

 Ryan Redman  - Vocals
 Stuart Steele - Guitar, backing vocals
 Joe Ward - Guitar
 James Steele  - Bass
 Chris Steele  - Drums
 Mark Williams  - Production

Critical response

The album received a "KKKK" (equivalent to 4/5) rating in Kerrang! magazine. Reviewer Steve Beebee described the album as "a mighty firm introductory handshake", singling out the tracks Technically Alive and Resume Ignore for specific praise and suggesting that the album might appeal to fans of Deftones and Still Remains.

References

Exit Ten albums